The 1980 Irpinia earthquake took place in Italy on 23 November 1980, with a moment magnitude of 6.9 and a maximum Mercalli intensity of X (Extreme). It left at least 2,483 people dead, at least 7,700 injured, and 250,000 homeless.

Event

The quake struck at 18:34 UTC (19:34 local), centered on the village of Castelnuovo di Conza, Campania, Southern Italy. The first jolt was followed by 90 aftershocks. There were three main shocks, each with epicenters in a different place, within 80 seconds. The largest shock registered a peak acceleration of 0.38g, with 10 seconds of motion greater than 0.1g. The three main shocks combined produced 70 seconds of shaking greater than 0.01g. Thus the shaking was severe and lasted a long time. Towns in the province of Avellino were hit the hardest. In Sant'Angelo dei Lombardi, 300 were killed, including 27 children in an orphanage, and eighty percent of the town was destroyed and many historical buildings were left in ruins as the town never fully recovered as of 2021. One hundred were killed in Balvano when a medieval church collapsed during Sunday services. The towns of Lioni, Conza della Campania (near the epicenter), and Teora were destroyed, and dozens of structures in Naples were levelled, including a 10-story apartment building. Damage was spread over more than 26,000 km2, including Naples and Salerno.

Rebuilding
The Italian government spent 59 trillion lire on reconstruction, while other nations sent contributions. West Germany contributed 32 million United States dollars (USD) and the United States US$70 million.

However, in the early 1990s a major corruption scandal emerged. Of the billions of lire that were earmarked for aid to the victims and rebuilding, the largest part disappeared from the earthquake reconstruction funds in the 1980s. Of the $40 billion spent on earthquake reconstruction, an estimated $20 billion went to create an entirely new social class of millionaires in the region, $6.4 billion went to the criminal Camorra, whereas another $4 billion went to politicians in bribes. Only the remaining $9.6 billion, a quarter of the total amount, was actually spent on people's needs.

The Camorra entered the construction industry after the quake.

See also

List of earthquakes in 1980
List of earthquakes in Italy
1930 Irpinia earthquake
List of earthquakes in Irpinia

Footnotes

Further reading

External links
INGV - sismica Map 
Memory and Images Earthquake 1980 
Earthquake 1980 Gesualdo 
INGV page on the earthquake 

1980 disasters in Italy
1980 earthquakes
1980 in Italy
20th century in Campania
Disasters in Campania
Earthquakes in Italy
Guardia Lombardi
November 1980 events in Europe
Province of Avellino